The Baltimore Comic-Con is a comic book-oriented fan convention held annually in Baltimore since 2000. 

Each year, the show features marquee-name comic book creators past and present, publishers, charitable organizations, and vendor booths offering genre-related items, including comic book back-issues, limited edition collectible items such as Toon Tumblers and clothing, videos/DVDs, etc. Panel discussions throughout the day feature industry names presenting information on current and upcoming industry events, past hallmarks in comic book history, and information on the industry and how to be a part of it.

History 
Founded by Marc Nathan, owner of Cards, Comics, and Collectibles of Reistertown, Maryland, the show was originally a one-day show held at the Sheraton Hotel in the Chartley Shopping Center, located in the Baltimore suburb of Towson, Maryland. 

The show continued to grow in size, and in 2002, it show moved to the Baltimore Convention Center in downtown Baltimore, across from Camden Yards and down the street from Geppi's Entertainment Museum, and was extended to a two-day show. In 2014, responding to demand from attendees and exhibitors, the show moved to a three-day event, from September 5 to 7.

An annual Yearbook, featuring renderings by attending artists, became a part of the show in 2012, featuring Frank Cho's Liberty Meadows characters, followed by Stan Sakai's Usagi Yojimbo in 2013 and Matt Wagner's Grendel in 2014. A scavenger hunt is also associated with the Yearbook, where attendees who get a pre-defined number of contributor autographs receive prints that were not part of the book, featuring characters from that year's theme by other attending artists.

The 2020 Comic-Con was cancelled due to the COVID-19 pandemic and rescheduled for the same dates as a virtual event.

List of convention dates
October 29, 2000
October 28, 2001
October 26 - 27, 2002
September 20 - 21, 2003
September 11 - 12, 2004
September 17 - 18, 2005
September 9 - 10, 2006
September 8 - 9, 2007
September 27 - 28, 2008
October 10 - 11, 2009
August 28 - 29, 2010
August 20 - 21, 2011
September 8 - 9, 2012
September 7 - 8, 2013
September 5 - 7, 2014
September 25 - 27, 2015
September 2 - 4, 2016
September 22 - 24, 2017
September 28 - 30, 2018
 October 18 - 20, 2019
 October 23 – 25, 2020 — cancelled due to COVID-19 pandemic; rescheduled as a virtual event

Comics industry awards venue 
In 2006, the 19th Annual Harvey Awards, named for comics creator Harvey Kurtzman, and developed to honor comic book industry professionals and companies singled out by their peers, moved from the Museum of Comic and Cartoon Art (MoCCA) in New York City to the Baltimore Comic-Con, with Kyle Baker as Master of Ceremonies. The Harvey Awards were held every year at the Baltimore Comic-Con from 2006 to 2016, when they moved to a new venue. The Harvey Awards were replaced with the creation of the Mike Wieringo Comic Book Industry Awards, or Ringo Awards", beginning with the September 2017 convention.

See also
 Fandom
 Science fiction convention
 Comic Art Convention

References

External links
 Baltimore Comic-Con Homepage 
 Harvey Awards Homepage 

Conventions in Baltimore
Comics conventions in the United States
Recurring events established in 2000
2000 establishments in Maryland